Captain Haddock mostly refers to the fictional character in The Adventures of Tintin by Hergé. The name may also refer to:
Herbert Haddock, British naval officer (1861–1946)
Richard Haddock, British naval officer (c.1629–1715)
Richard Haddock (Royal Navy officer, born 1673), British naval officer and the latter's son (1673–1751)